Manduca brontes is a species of moth in the family Sphingidae first described by Dru Drury in 1773. It is known from Jamaica, Cuba, Haiti, Puerto Rico, the Cayman Islands, the Dominican Republic and Suriname.

Adults are on wing from April to June in Florida.

The larvae have been recorded feeding on Tecoma species (including Tecoma stans), Fraxinus americana, Fraxinus excelsior and Fraxinus platycarpa.

Subspecies
M. brontes brontes (Jamaica and Cuba, Greater Antilles and northern South America)
M. brontes cubensis (Kitching and Cadiou, 2000) (Cuba, Haiti, Puerto Rico, the Cayman Islands and Florida)
M. brontes haitiensis (B.P. Clark, 1916) (Haiti and the Dominican Republic)
M. brontes pamphilius (Cramer, 1782) (Suriname)

References

External links

brontes
Moths of North America
Sphingidae of South America
Lepidoptera of the Caribbean
Insects of Cuba
Insects of the Dominican Republic
Insects of Haiti
Lepidoptera of Jamaica
Fauna of Suriname
Moths described in 1773
Taxa named by Dru Drury